This article contains a list of presidents of Ecuador, since the independence from Gran Colombia (1830) to the present day.

Background
Juan José Flores was the first constitutional president of Ecuador, declaring the separation of the State of Ecuador from Gran Colombia, maintaining its presidential government structure, which has remained until the present day. Between 1830 and 1845, the office of President of the Republic was elected indirectly, that is, through the Legislature. The first presidents were mostly elected through Constituent Assemblies, a tradition in the politics of Ecuador which remained until 1967, with Otto Arosemena being the last constitutional president elected through the Constituent Assembly. This is one of the reasons why Ecuador has had 20 Constitutions since its foundation, many of them created with the intention of legitimizing the government of a president. Since 1869, the president is elected by popular vote; however, it should be borne in mind that during the 19th century, Ecuador lived a census democracy: only men with sufficient income and decent office voted, being Francisco Robles the first president elected by direct vote.

Between 1906 and 1944, during the Liberal Revolution, the elections were held in a generally fraudulent or corrupt manner, so the year 1944 is estimated as the beginning of democracy in Ecuador. Between 1906 and 1947, there was no office of Vice President. Between 1947 and 1970, the president and vice president were elected separately. Since 1979, the president and vice president are elected by direct suffrage on the same ballot. Since 1998, a candidate who obtains more than 40% of votes can also win, provided he has a difference of at least 10% over the second candidate. All these percentages are calculated on the total valid votes (that is, without counting null and blank votes).

The history of Ecuador has been full of instability, usually centered on the figure of the President of the Republic, which is why Ecuador's political culture has been traditionally called caudillista. During the 19th century, the country was torn apart twice after the overthrow of the presidents Francisco Robles and Ignacio de Veintemilla, with regional governments seeking access to national power. Until 1947, the majority of the constitutional presidents of the Republic came to power through coups d'etat, exercising dictatorial power which would be legitimized through the implementation of new constitutions, so that the governance and stability of the presidents has been usually weak, which is why there has been many presiding and interim presidents. There were two military dictatorships in the country (1963–1966 and 1972–1979) before democracy returned with the election of Jaime Roldós Aguilera. From 1996 to 2005, 3 constitutional presidents were overthrown (Abdalá Bucaram, Jamil Mahuad and Lucio Gutiérrez). The left-wing populist government of Rafael Correa (2007–2017) has been the most stable in national history, being able to remain in power constitutionally without interruptions for 10 years and 4 months. Dr. José María Velasco Ibarra is the longest-serving president since he held office for a total of 12 years, 10 months and 6 days and was elected President 5 times (1934–35, 1944–47, 1952–56, 1960–61 and 1968–1972).

List of presidents

Presidents of the State of Quito

Presidents of the Free Province of Guayaquil

Presidents of the State of Ecuador (1830–1979)

Presidents of the Republic of Ecuador (1979–present)

Timeline

Rival governments in rebellion

See also
President of Ecuador
History of Ecuador

References

Presidents
Presidents
1830 establishments in Ecuador
Ecuador
Presidents